Always You may refer to:

 Always You (album), a 1993 album by James Ingram
 "Always You" (Charice Pempengco song)
 "Always You" (Jennifer Paige song), 1999